Steve Cassidy is an English singer. He started his singing career at the age of 14, opening a Cliff Richard concert. Cassidy has recorded with Joe Meek and later with the film composer John Barry. He worked with The Escorts in the 1960s performing around the British Isles.

Cassidy has appeared on television, most notably as three time winner of New Faces. He wrote the song which welcomed Pope John Paul II on his visit to York. Steve has composed songs for musical concerts including Little Poppy of Flanders for Remembrance Day. He has written three musical plays. He has performed Fagin in the musical Oliver! and appeared in and directed Sweet Bird of Youth by Tennessee Williams. He is a member of Equity, the actors and performers union.

External links
Steve Cassidy official website

Living people
English male singers
English songwriters
English male stage actors
Year of birth missing (living people)
British male songwriters